Vinchhavad is a village and former non-salute princely state on Saurashtra peninsula in Gujarat, western India.

History 
Vinchhavad, a minor princely state in Sorath prant, ranking as Sixth Class state during the British raj, was ruled by Nagar Brahmins Chieftains.

In 1901 it comprised a single village, covering four square miles, with a population of 414, yielding 4,100 Rupees state revenue (1903-4, nearly all from land), paying no tribute.

References

External links and Sources 
 Imperial Gazetteer, on DSAL.UChicago.edu - Kathiawar

Princely states of Gujarat